The 1996 election of the Speaker of the New Zealand House of Representatives occurred on 12 December 1996, following the 1996 general election result. The election saw the incumbent speaker Peter Tapsell lose his parliamentary seat. It resulted in the election of National Party MP Doug Kidd as Speaker. It was the first time a vote for speaker had been contested since 1923.

Nominated candidates
Two candidates were nominated:
 Rt Hon Jonathan Hunt, List MP – Labour Party
 Hon Doug Kidd, MP for  – National Party

Derek Quigley, the deputy leader of the ACT Party, also intended to stand as a candidate but ultimately did not put forward his name for nomination.

Election
The election was conducted by means of a conventional parliamentary motion. The Clerk of the House of Representatives conducted a vote on the question of the election of the Speaker, in accordance with Standing Order 19.

The following table gives the election results:

How each MP voted:

Ian Revell was elected deputy speaker on 13 December by  61 votes to 58 over Jonathan Hunt. National and New Zealand First voted for Revell with Labour, the Alliance and ACT voting for Hunt.

References

Speaker of the House of Representatives election
Speaker of the House of Representatives election
Speaker of the House of Representatives of New Zealand elections